Anbarak (also Romanized as Anbārak; also known as Ambārak and Ambārka) is a village in Baghak Rural District, in the Central District of Tangestan County, Bushehr Province, Iran. At the 2006 census, its population was 349, in 83 families.

References 

Populated places in Tangestan County